2017 European Masters can mean:

2017 European Masters (curling)
2017 European Masters (snooker)